See:
:Category:Towns in Northern Ireland
List of towns in Northern Ireland
:Category:Towns and villages in the Republic of Ireland
List of towns and villages in the Republic of Ireland

Ireland-related lists